Khoo Chong Beng (born 5 August 1948) is a Malaysian racewalker. He competed in the men's 20 kilometres walk at the 1976 Summer Olympics.

References

1948 births
Living people
Athletes (track and field) at the 1976 Summer Olympics
Malaysian male racewalkers
Olympic athletes of Malaysia
Place of birth missing (living people)
Asian Games medalists in athletics (track and field)
Asian Games bronze medalists for Malaysia
Athletes (track and field) at the 1978 Asian Games
Medalists at the 1978 Asian Games
Southeast Asian Games medalists in athletics
Southeast Asian Games gold medalists for Malaysia
Southeast Asian Games silver medalists for Malaysia
Competitors at the 1977 Southeast Asian Games
20th-century Malaysian people